Giddawa-Waradiwela Grama Niladhari Division is a Grama Niladhari Division of the Medadumbara Divisional Secretariat of Kandy District of Central Province, Sri Lanka. It has Grama Niladhari Division Code 752.

Waradiwala are located within, nearby or associated with Giddawa-Waradiwela.

Giddawa-Waradiwela is a surrounded by the Waradiwela, Weliketiya, Dunhinna and Randiwela Grama Niladhari Divisions.

Demographics

Ethnicity 
The Giddawa-Waradiwela Grama Niladhari Division has a Sinhalese majority (96.4%). In comparison, the Medadumbara Divisional Secretariat (which contains the Giddawa-Waradiwela Grama Niladhari Division) has a Sinhalese majority (75.1%) and a significant Indian Tamil population (10.6%)

Religion 
The Giddawa-Waradiwela Grama Niladhari Division has a Buddhist majority (96.4%). In comparison, the Medadumbara Divisional Secretariat (which contains the Giddawa-Waradiwela Grama Niladhari Division) has a Buddhist majority (74.8%) and a significant Hindu population (16.2%)

References 

Grama Niladhari Divisions of Medadumbara Divisional Secretariat